Max Volume is the stage name of American musician, radio personality, and voice-over artist Glenn Bailey. Volume is a disc jockey at Reno, Nevada Classic rock radio station KOZZ, and a singer-songwriter-guitarist with the [Max Volume Band]. Either solo or with The Max Volume Band, he has opened shows for Aerosmith, Y&T, Eddie Money, UFO, Thin Lizzy, Dave Mason, Lacy J. Dalton, Pat Travers, Les Dudek, Steve Morse, Mike Keneally, Ned Evett, Mickey Thomas, Foghat, Edgar Winter, Reo Speedwagon, Frank Hannon of Tesla, and many others. He has released 6 albums on the Tadzhiq Music Group Label. For three consecutive years (1989–91) Volume was voted "Best Ears in America" by industry publication Friday Morning Quarterback (FMQB). In 2001, Volume was inducted into the Nevada Broadcasters Association Hall of Fame. Volume is the Afternoon Drive DJ, Mondays through Fridays, on KOZZ-FM 105.7.

Born Glenn Bailey, Volume was raised in Glendale, California. He graduated from Crescenta Valley High School in La Crescenta California. Volume earned his associate degree from Truckee Meadows Community College in 2006. After receiving a guitar at age 9 he taught himself to play, and studied the music of Jimmy Page, Pete Townshend and Neil Young. Volume's father, Ralph, the chief deputy coroner of Los Angeles County, did not support his musical aspirations, due to the amount of dead young guitar players in the L.A. County Morgue. His mother Joni was the International President of Sweet Adelines International and often bought him song books.

Radio career

Volume moved to Reno in 1979, and began working at Eucalyptus Records & Tapes. It was there he met Michael Schivo and worked as a stage hand for High Sierra Concerts and Michael Schivo Presents. After meeting Bill Graham, in February 1981, he worked for many years as a stage hand for Bill Graham Presents, eventually becoming voice talent for the Reno concert market commercials. He has played with Chuck Ruff, and the rock band Terraplane.  In the Fall of 1981, he took an internship at the Reno, Nevada radio station KOZZ, while attending Truckee Meadows Community College. KOZZ Program Director, Daniel Cook, made him on-air talent in March 1982. After discovering the phrase "Max Volume" was displayed on the face of everybody's radio dial, Bailey adopted the on-air moniker "Max Volume".

In 1987, Volume met Whitesnake's David Coverdale, who mentored him on the business aspects of the music industry. Volume became involved with the Whitesnake album "Slip of the Tongue" and the Coverdale/Page project, where he met Led Zeppelin's Jimmy Page. Page inspired Volume to explore different guitar tunings and modalities.

He continued his radio career as Program Director at Reno modern-rock station KRZQ ('87- '92) Programming Assistant at Sacramento rock station KRXQ ('92- '94) and Program Director of Reno metal station KZAK ('94- '96). He helped launch Reno active-rock station KDOT, and became Music Director for Lotus Communications Corporation. He has been an on-air disc jockey at classic-rock KOZZ since 1996, and he is also the webmaster for kdot.com & kozzradio.com. In 2007 he launched the Max Volume Band.

Controversy

In the late 1980s, Volume supported the British rock band, Judas Priest, in court, when they were sued by families of two young Sparks, Nevada men who had shot themselves in a suicide pact while listening to an album, "Stained Class." The band was eventually exonerated. For his support of the band, Volume became the target of hate groups, fueled by media coverage of the suit, receiving on-air death threats and harassment. In 2013 he was back in court again, testifying in the Jack Russell vs Mark Kendall, Audie Desbrow, Michael Lardie case over who owned the band name Great White.

Discography

1983 Psycho Betty BBQ (Dancing Soda Songs). Solo Acoustic
2001 Written in Stone (Tadzhiq Music Group). Solo Acoustic
2004 MV (Tadzhiq Music Group). Solo Acoustic
2006 Live Volume (Tadzhiq Music Group). Solo Acoustic
2007 Illuminaughty (Tadzhiq Music Group). Max Volume Band: Widgeon Holland, Chuck Ruff (of The Edgar Winter Group, and Sammy Hagar), John Gaddis, Max Volume
2009 Live8 (Tadzhiq Music Group). Max Volume Band: Lenny Supera, John Gaddis, Greg Sample, Max Volume
2011 Max Volume (Tadzhiq Music Group). Max Volume Band: Troy Mowat (of 7 Seconds), Billy Allen, Max Volume

Television and film

For fifteen years, Volume was the Reno market voice-over for concert producers Bill Graham Presents. He has been the television voice on commercials for Carson Harley Davidson, Bizarre Guitar and the Songwriters and Performance Institute.

Volume wrote and performed all the songs in the campus safety advocacy film, Take Back The Night, created by independent filmmaker Jack Sutton, in conjunction with the Bring Bri Justice Foundation and in accordance with the University of Nevada Police Department.

Volume wrote and performed three tracks ("Reno, Nevada", "Long Road to Nowhere" and "Baby's Got Ink") in the Myrton Running Wolf critically acclaimed short film Jarin. The independent film was screened at The New York Film Festival and the Sundance Film Festival.

Volume's "Long Road To Nowhere" from 2007's Illuminaughty cd is featured in the 2015 Galaxie 500 Films Nowhere Nevada, in which Volume also plays the role of "K", a mastermind criminal. Nowhere Nevada won "Best Film" at the San Francisco Global Movie Festival in 2015. The movie was released globally in 2016 via Wild Eye Releasing.

References
 http://www.newsreview.com/reno/home, Reno News & Review, April 10–16, Vol. 14, issue 10, "101 People, Places & Things that helped shape the Reno Music Scene" author Brent Busboom.
 James Vance et al. versus Judas Priest
 All selections Tadzhiq Music Group, Dancing Soda Songs
 1984 Terraplane "Tell the Truth" Produced by Don Dokken

External links

 http://www.rgj.com/article/20080922/NEWS/80922036/0/NEWS18

American rock musicians
Living people
Musicians from Glendale, California
Year of birth missing (living people)